Anica is a female given name used among Romanians, Serbs, Slovenes, Croats, etc. It is derived from Anna. Notable people with the name include:

 Anica Bošković (1714–1804), Ragusan writer
Anica Černej (1900–1944), Slovene author and poet
 Anica Dobra (born 1963), Serbian film actress
 Anica Kovač née Martinović, Croatian model, Miss Croatia 1995
Anica Neto (born 1972), Angolan handball player
 Anica Nonveiller, Serbian-born Canadian journalist, writer and producer
Anica Savić Rebac (1892–1953), Serbian writer, classical philologist and translator
Anica Mrose Rissi, American author

See also
 Anicka
 Anika

Romanian feminine given names
Serbian feminine given names